A regional election was held in Madeira on 29 March 2015, to determine the composition of the Legislative Assembly of the Autonomous Region of Madeira. The election was the first in which the former President of the Region, Alberto João Jardim, was not on the ballot as he earlier stated that he would step down as President and leader of the PSD-Madeira in January 2015. On 29 December 2014, the PSD-Madeira elected  Miguel Albuquerque as the new president of the party's regional section. After winning the presidency, Albuquerque stated that he would not assume the Presidency of the Government without an election, so Alberto João Jardim asked President Aníbal Cavaco Silva to dissolve the Parliament and call an election, which was scheduled for 29 March.

The campaign for the regional legislative election in Madeira ran from 15 to 27 March 2015.

The results showed that the Social Democrats were reelected for the 11th time in a row and, again, with an absolute majority of 24 seats, against the 25 seats won in 2011. The People's Party was again the second most voted party and the coalition between the Socialists and other smaller parties called Change suffered a huge defeat by winning fewer votes and seats compared to the combined total of the parties in 2011. Together for the People was the surprise of the election winning 10.3% of the vote and winning 5 seats. The Unitary Democratic Coalition increase their result by one MP and the Left Bloc returned to the regional parliament with 2 seats.

The turnout in these elections was the lowest ever, with 49.6% of voters casting a ballot.

Electoral system
The 47 members of the Madeiran regional parliament are elected in a single constituency by proportional representation under the D'Hondt method, coinciding with the territory of the Region.

Parties 
The parties that will contest the election and their leaders, are:

 Change (PS-PTP-PAN-MPT), Victor Freitas
 Citizen Platform (PPM-PDA), Miguel Fonseca
 Unitary Democratic Coalition (CDU), Edgar Silva
 New Democracy Party (PND), Baltazar Aguiar
 Workers' Communist Party (PCTP/MRPP), Alexandre Caldeira
 Left Bloc (BE), Roberto Almada
 National Renovator Party (PNR), Álvaro Araújo
 People's Party (CDS–PP), José Manuel Rodrigues
 Social Democratic Party (PSD), Miguel Albuquerque
 Socialist Alternative Movement (MAS), José Carlos Gonçalves Jardim
 Together for the People (JPP), Filipe Sousa

Opinion polling 
Poll results are listed in the table below in reverse chronological order, showing the most recent first. The highest percentage figure in each polling survey is displayed in bold, and the background shaded in the leading party's colour. In the instance that there is a tie, then no figure is shaded but both are displayed in bold. The lead column on the right shows the percentage-point difference between the two parties with the highest figures. Poll results use the date the survey's fieldwork was done, as opposed to the date of publication.

Opinion polls

Seats
Opinion polls showing seat projections are displayed in the table below. The highest seat figures in each polling survey have their background shaded in the leading party's colour. In the instance that there is a tie, then no figure is shaded. 24 seats are required for an absolute majority in the Legislative Assembly of Madeira.

Summary of votes and seats

|-
| colspan=11| 
|- 
! rowspan="2" colspan=2 style="background-color:#E9E9E9" align=left|Parties
! rowspan="2" style="background-color:#E9E9E9" align=right|Votes
! rowspan="2" style="background-color:#E9E9E9" align=right|%
! rowspan="2" style="background-color:#E9E9E9" align=right|±pp swing
! colspan="5" style="background-color:#E9E9E9" align="center"|MPs
! rowspan="2" style="background-color:#E9E9E9;text-align:right;" |MPs %/votes %
|- style="background-color:#E9E9E9"
! style="background-color:#E9E9E9;text-align:center;"|2011
! style="background-color:#E9E9E9;text-align:center;"| 2015
! style="background-color:#E9E9E9" align=right|±
! style="background-color:#E9E9E9" align=right|%
! style="background-color:#E9E9E9" align=right|±
|-
| 
||56,574||44.36||4.2||25||24||1||51.06||2.1||1.15
|-
| 
||17,488||13.71||3.9||9||7||2||14.89||4.3||1.09
|-
|style="width: 10px" bgcolor=#FF66FF align="center" | 
|align=left|Change Coalition
||14,573||11.43||11.0||11||6||5||12.77||10.6||1.12
|-
| 
||13,114||10.28||||||5||||10.64||||1.03
|-
| 
||7,060||5.54||1.8||1||2||1||4.25||2.1||0.77
|-
| 
||4,849||3.80||2.1||0||2||2||4.25||4.3||1.12
|-
| 
||2,635||2.07||1.2||1||1||0||2.13||0.0||1.04
|-
| 
||2,137||1.67||||||0||||0.00||||0.0
|-
| 
||1,715||1.34||||||0||||0.00||||0.0
|-
| 
||1,052||0.82||||||0||||0.00||||0.0
|-
|style="width: 10px" bgcolor=white align="center" | 
|align=left|Citizen Platform
||903||0.71||||||0||||0.00||||0.0
|-
|colspan=2 align=left style="background-color:#E9E9E9"|Total valid
|width="50" align="right" style="background-color:#E9E9E9"|122,100
|width="40" align="right" style="background-color:#E9E9E9"|95.74
|width="40" align="right" style="background-color:#E9E9E9"|1.6
|width="40" align="right" style="background-color:#E9E9E9"|47
|width="40" align="right" style="background-color:#E9E9E9"|47
|width="40" align="right" style="background-color:#E9E9E9"|0
|width="40" align="right" style="background-color:#E9E9E9"|100.00
|width="40" align="right" style="background-color:#E9E9E9"|0.0
|width="40" align="right" style="background-color:#E9E9E9"|—
|-
|colspan=2|Blank ballots
||1,116||0.87||0.2||colspan=6 rowspan=4|
|-
|colspan=2|Invalid ballots
||4,323||3.39||1.5
|-
|colspan=2 align=left style="background-color:#E9E9E9"|Total
|width="50" align="right" style="background-color:#E9E9E9"|127,539
|width="40" align="right" style="background-color:#E9E9E9"|100.00
|width="40" align="right" style="background-color:#E9E9E9"|
|-
|colspan=2|Registered voters/turnout
||257,232||49.58||7.8
|-
| colspan=11 align=left|Coalition between the PS, PTP, PAN and the MPT. The 11 seats from 2011 are the sum of PS, PTP, PAN and MPT seats.Portuguese Communist Party (2 MPs) and "The Greens" (0 MPs) ran in coalition.People's Monarchist Party (0 MPs) and Democratic Party of the Atlantic (0 MPs) ran in coalition.
|-
| colspan=11 align=left | Source: Comissão Nacional de Eleições
|}

See also
Madeira

Notes

References

External links
Election results
Comissão Nacional de Eleições

2015 elections in Portugal
2015
March 2015 events in Portugal